Honeymoon Hotel is a 1934 Warner Bros. Merrie Melodies cartoon directed by Earl Duvall. The short was released on February 17, 1934.

The film was supervised by Earl Duvall. The characters were animated by Jack King, Frank Tipper, both credited, Bob Clampett, Paul Fennell, Chuck Jones and Frank Tashlin, final four uncredited. The music score was composed by Bernard Brown (solely credited) and Norman Spencer (solely uncredited). The sound was solely recorded by Bernard Brown in the uncredited. Production number 6125.

Plot

The cartoon follows a male and female bug/insect who check into a hotel which catches on fire.

Music
The song "Honeymoon Hotel" (by Al Dubin and Harry Warren) was originally introduced in the 1933 Warner Bros. film Footlight Parade. This short appears on the DVD release of that film.

Color process

The film is notable for being the first Warner Bros. cartoon produced in color. It used Cinecolor since Walt Disney had exclusive rights to the Technicolor process.  There was only one other Merrie Melodies cartoon produced in Cinecolor (Beauty and the Beast) before the series went briefly back to black-and-white. Later, the Merrie Melodies moved to Technicolor, though the Looney Tunes continued to be produced in black-and-white until 1943. Cinecolor would make a return in several late 1940s Looney Tunes and Merrie Melodies shorts.

References

External links

Honeymoon Hotel at BCDB
Honeymoon Hotel on the Internet Archive

1934 films
1934 animated films
1934 musical comedy films
American musical comedy films
Cinecolor films
Films scored by Bernard B. Brown
Films scored by Norman Spencer (composer)
Animated films about insects
Films directed by Earl Duvall
Films set in hotels
Merrie Melodies short films
1930s Warner Bros. animated short films
1930s English-language films